Tera Naam Mera Naam is a 1988 Hindi language romance comedy film directed by Ramesh Talwar. Karan Shah plays the role of a scheduled caste boy who loves a girl belonging to a higher class. He exchanges his identity with another boy belonging to a higher caste.

In his book Eena Meena Deeka: The Story of Hindi Film Comedy, film critic Sanjit Narwekar described it as a "new wave twist to an age old mainstream situation."

References

External links 

 

1988 films
1988 romantic comedy films
1980s Hindi-language films
Indian romantic comedy films